Scaphiodonichthys burmanicus is a species of cyprinid fish of the genus Scaphiodonichthys. It inhabits inland wetlands in Myanmar where it is locally used for food. It has been assessed as "least concern" on the IUCN Red List. It is considered harmless to humans.

References

Cyprinidae
Cyprinid fish of Asia
Fish of Myanmar
IUCN Red List least concern species